Ray A. Ride (March 4, 1904 – May 6, 1990) was an American football player, coach, and college athletic administrator.  He served as the head football coach at Case Institute of Technology—now known as Case Western Reserve University—from 1930 to 1949, compiling record of 80–77–8.
Case honored Ride by changing their fight name from Scientists to Rough Riders in 1940.

Playing career
Ride played tackle at Washington & Jefferson under College Football Hall of Fame coach Andrew Kerr.  He was a brother of Alpha Tau Omega.

Head football coach
While starting his coaching career at his alma mater Washington & Jefferson, Ride held the unusual role of sharing the head coaching position with Bill Amos.  After the season, Ride resigned citing it being too difficult to operate under dual authority.

In 1930, he accepted the role of head football coach for the Case Tech Scientists. Case Tech's final conference titles would be won under Ride, winning the Ohio Athletic Conference (OAC) twice (1932, 1941) and the Big Four Conference once (1933).

Ride was integral in the creation of the Big Four Conference in 1933, leveraging his relationship with John Carroll's coach Ralph Vince, a fellow Washington & Jefferson alum, establishing the full round-robin of the four schools.  Another founder of the conference was head coach Ray Watts of Baldwin Wallace.

Ride was the first guest speaker for the Cleveland Touchdown Club in 1938, invited by founder and president Joe Fogg.  He became president of the club in 1959.

Head coaching record

References

1904 births
1990 deaths
Washington & Jefferson Presidents football players
Washington & Jefferson Presidents football coaches
Case Western Spartans football coaches
Case Western Spartans
Sportspeople from Cleveland
Players of American football from Cleveland